David Gerardo Ramírez Ruiz DR7 (born 28 May 1993) is a Costa Rican professional footballer who plays as a forward for Deportivo Saprissa

Club career
Ramírez is a product of the Saprissa youth system and debuted in the Premier Division in the 2013/14 season. In September 2014, he was suspended for two matches by Saprissa coach Rónald González for alleged misconduct.

On 12 January 2015, Ramírez was loaned out to French club Evian on a six-month deal. On 6 July 2016, he joined Portuguese club Moreirense on a loan deal.

On 21 July 2018, Ramírez joined Cypriot First Division club AC Omonia on a three-year contract.

International career
Ramírez represented Costa Rica at 2015 CONCACAF Gold Cup, scoring one goal in three matches. He also played for the team at 2017 CONCACAF Gold Cup.

International goals
Scores and results list Costa Rica's goal tally first.

Honors
Saprissa
Costa Rican Primera División: 2013–14 Verano

Moreirense
Taça da Liga: 2016–17

Costa Rica
Copa Centroamericana: 2014

References

External links
 
 

1993 births
Living people
Footballers from San José, Costa Rica
Association football forwards
Costa Rican footballers
Costa Rican expatriate footballers
Costa Rica under-20 international footballers
Costa Rica international footballers
Deportivo Saprissa players
Thonon Evian Grand Genève F.C. players
Moreirense F.C. players
AC Omonia players
Liga FPD players
Ligue 1 players
Primeira Liga players
Cypriot First Division players
2014 Copa Centroamericana players
2015 CONCACAF Gold Cup players
2017 CONCACAF Gold Cup players
Copa Centroamericana-winning players
Central American Games silver medalists for Costa Rica
Central American Games medalists in football
Expatriate footballers in Portugal
Expatriate footballers in France
Expatriate footballers in Cyprus
Costa Rican expatriate sportspeople in Portugal
Costa Rican expatriate sportspeople in France
Costa Rican expatriate sportspeople in Cyprus